Mikhalko Yuryevich (died June 20, 1176), Prince of Torchesk (mid-1160s–1173), Vladimir and Suzdal (1175–1176) and Grand Prince of Kiev (Kyiv, 1171).

Yuri Dolgoruky's eldest son by his second marriage, Mikhalko Yuryevich was removed from the Suzdal lands by his half-brother Andrei Bogolyubsky, who apparently disliked his mother.

From 1162 to 1169 he lived in Ostyor, a small town near Chernigov, but then moved on to a town of Torchesk. Appointed by Andrei to rule Kiev upon the death of Gleb Yuriyevich in 1171, Mikhalko refused to take the throne and sent his younger brother Vsevolod to Kiev instead. He was besieged in Torchesk by another claimant to Kiev, Yaropolk Rostislavich, but concluded peace with him and was allowed to move his capital to Pereiaslav. The starving of his subjects prompted Mikhail's surrender after a week of holding the city. Next year, when Andrei invaded Southern Rus, he broke his ties with Rurik and swore allegiance to his brother.

Upon Andrei's death, Mikhalko Yuryevich succeeded him in Vladimir, but the hostilities with boyars of Suzdal and Rostov, who felt neglected by the rise of Vladimir, forced him to leave for Chernigov. The citizens of Vladimir soon called upon Mikhalko Yuryevich to help them fight against Yaropolk, son of Rostislav Yuryevich. He defeated this nephew of Andrei Bogolubsky's and regained the throne of Vladimir in 1175. Mikhalko died the next year and was succeeded by his brother Vsevolod.

References 

Year of birth missing
1176 deaths
Grand Princes of Vladimir
Rurik dynasty
Yurievichi family
Grand Princes of Kiev
12th-century princes in Kievan Rus'
Eastern Orthodox monarchs

Further reading
 Bibliography of the history of the Early Slavs and Rus'
 Bibliography of Russian history (1223–1613)
 List of Slavic studies journals